William Sellars (7 October 1907 – 1987) was an English professional footballer who played as a winger.

References

1907 births
1987 deaths
Footballers from Sheffield
English footballers
Association football wingers
Rotherham United F.C. players
Southport F.C. players
Burnley F.C. players
Bradford (Park Avenue) A.F.C. players
Lincoln City F.C. players
English Football League players